What's the Matador? is a 1942 short subject directed by Jules White starring American slapstick comedy team The Three Stooges (Moe Howard, Larry Fine and Curly Howard). It is the 62nd entry in the series released by Columbia Pictures starring the comedians, who released 190 shorts for the studio between 1934 and 1959.

Plot 
The Stooges are vaudeville entertainers who trek to Mexico to perform their gag bullfight shtick, with Curly as the brave matador, and Moe and Larry dressed in a bull costume. Along the way, they cross paths with attractive senorita Dolores Sanchez (Suzanne Kaaren). They also cross paths with her evil jealous, and hot-tempered, man-hating husband named José (Harry Burns) who threatens to kill Curly if he ever flirts his wife again with any weapon he would use. The next day at the bullfighting arena and during the comedy bullfight, José does recognize Curly and his friends (That Moe and Larry didn't do anything to his wife). And in an act of revenge on Curly for flirting with Dolores and entering their house with Moe and Larry, José pays the bullring attendants to release a live bull into the ring. Moe and Larry flee the ring, but Curly is unaware of the switch. He eventually head-butts the wild animal and is paraded out of the ring to the rousing cheers of "Olé, Americano!"

Production notes 
What's the Matador? was the last short filmed in 1941, shot on August 14–18 of that year. It was remade in 1959 as Sappy Bull Fighters, using minimal stock footage from the original. Footage was reused in the 1960 compilation feature film Stop! Look! and Laugh!

The film's title is a pun on the question "what's the matter?" The film itself is inspired by the popularity of the 1941 film Blood and Sand. While bullfighting is the reference, the two stories otherwise have nothing in common.

The Stooges have a frustrating exchange with an old Mexican local (Don Zelaya) when they ask if he has seen Dolores. Though his lengthy, involved, Spanish-language directions are incomprehensible to them, he actually says the following:
"Go down the street three blocks, turn right and go two more blocks, turn right, cross the square, and turn right. Walk down that street until you find an alley, but keep walking. Go down that street until you find another alley, but do not enter that alley. Turn right. There you will find a river. Do me a favor: jump into the river and drown yourself!"

DVD Talk critic Stuart Galbraith IV noted the beginnings of Curly Howard's physical decline, observing that "one can see the earliest signs of Curly's pre-stroke personality change. It's very subtle, and while he's still quite funny, one can see little changes in his screen persona, and about here he begins to age dramatically, with lines suddenly etched deep in his face."

References

External links 
 
 

1942 films
1942 comedy films
1942 short films
The Three Stooges films
American black-and-white films
Films directed by Jules White
Bullfighting films
Films set in Mexico
Columbia Pictures short films
American comedy short films
1940s English-language films
1940s American films